John Martin (born 4 May 1985), is a professional footballer who plays for Glenrothes in the SJFA East Superleague. He has previously played in the Scottish Football League First Division for Raith Rovers.

Career
Martin began his professional career with Raith Rovers before moving on to East Fife in 2005.

During a period on loan at Kelty Hearts, Martin played in the 2006–07 Scottish Junior Cup final, losing 2–1 after extra time to Linlithgow Rose. He joined Kelty permanently in 2008 before signing for Glenrothes in 2010. Martin had a season at Ballingry Rovers in 2012–13 but returned to Glenrothes and stepped up to the managers role in September 2016, after the resignation of Benny Andrew.

Martin resigned from his management position at Glenrothes in March 2017 and joined Dundonald Bluebell as a player later the same month. He moved on to Burntisland Shipyard in early 2018, before returning to Glenrothes in August that year.

References

External links
 (Raith Rovers appearances)
 (East Fife appearances)
Raith Rovers appearances at Post War English & Scottish Football League A - Z Player's Transfer Database
East Fife appearances at Post War English & Scottish Football League A - Z Player's Transfer Database

Living people
1985 births
Scottish footballers
Raith Rovers F.C. players
East Fife F.C. players
Kelty Hearts F.C. players
Glenrothes F.C. players
Ballingry Rovers F.C. players
Dundonald Bluebell F.C. players
Scottish Football League players
Scottish Junior Football Association players
Scottish football managers
Association football forwards